The Chevrolet Silverado EV is a battery electric full-size pickup truck to be manufactured by General Motors under the Chevrolet brand. Introduced in January 2022, the Silverado EV will go on sale in 2023 for the 2024 model year in the North American market.

Despite using the Silverado nameplate, the vehicle does not share its underpinnings with the ICE-powered Silverado, as it is built on a narrower version of the dedicated electric platform used by the GMC Hummer EV. It is the first Chevrolet-branded electric pickup truck after the experimental S-10 EV.

The GMC counterpart, the GMC Sierra EV was introduced in October 2022 with a restyled exterior and interior design.

Overview 

The Silverado EV was introduced at the 2022 Consumer Electronics Show (CES) on January 5, 2022. Instead of using the existing Silverado platform, it uses the electric-only BT1 platform with an Ultium battery. While the wheelbase and overall length are similar to the ICE-powered Silverado, the proportions are significantly altered which enables it to adopt a more aerodynamic exterior design and a forward-shifted cab to increase interior space. It is available in a four-door Crew Cab configuration.

All models are powered by front and rear electric motors with optional 200 kWh battery and uses independent front and rear suspension.

The truck features a midgate which is similar to the one in the Avalanche, which allows the wall separating the bed from the cab to be lowered in a 60:40 split to increase the effective bed length while leaving room for a rear passenger. The rear glass is removable and can be stored in the folding section, further enlarging the opening. Combined with the tailgate, the 5.9 feet long bed is extendable to 10 feet 10 inches. The front hood hosts a front trunk capable of handling three large suitcases.

Production will start in the Factory Zero assembly plant (formerly Detroit-Hamtramck Assembly) in the second quarter of 2023.

Trim levels 

Two trim levels were available at its introduction, which are the base, fleet-oriented WT (work truck) and the flagship RST First Edition, while other trim levels between them will be released later.

The WT trim features a more basic appearance, silver-painted steel wheels, black front and rear bumpers and exterior accents, and a vinyl interior with rubberized floors, while the RST features a sporty appearance with large aluminum-alloy wheels, color-keyed front and rear bumpers and exterior accents, a luxury leather-trimmed interior, and carpeted flooring with front and rear floor mats. Both models include a touchscreen infotainment system with Apple CarPlay and Android Auto smartphone integration, as well as a large Thin Film Transistor (TFT) reconfigurable LCD full-color instrument cluster display screen. Also standard on both models are LED front headlamps and a dual-zone automatic climate control system. 

The RST First Edition trim features a drive mode called Wide Open Watts, that enables  time in less than 4.5 seconds.

GM expects about 400 miles of range on a full charge from both the WT and RST trims. The WT model is expected to arrive in spring of 2023, whereas the RST First Edition model will arrive in fall of 2023. Additional trim levels, such as the off-road oriented Trail Boss, will also debut in the future.

References

External links 

 
 Sierra Denali EV (twin model)

Silverado EV
Pickup trucks
Cars introduced in 2022
Rear-wheel-drive vehicles
All-wheel-drive vehicles
Upcoming car models
Electric trucks